Milan Štěch (born 13 November 1953 in České Budějovice) is a Czech social-democratic politician and former trade union leader who served as the President of the Senate of the Czech Republic from 2010 to 2018 and was Senator from Pelhřimov from 1996 to 2020. From 2008 to 2010, he served as Vice-President of the Senate. Since 14 November 2018 he has been Vice-President of the Senate of the Czech Republic again.

He was a member of Czechoslovakian Communist Party, (between 1978 and 1989) Civic Forum (1989 – ?) and since 1997 he has been a member of Czech Social Democratic Party.

References

External links 

 www.milan-stech.cz Official website

1953 births
Living people
Czech trade unionists
Politicians from České Budějovice
Communist Party of Czechoslovakia members
Czech Social Democratic Party Senators
Presidents of the Senate of the Czech Republic
Presidents of Bohemian-Moravian Confederation of Trade Unions